The following outline is provided as an overview of and topical guide to underwater diving:

Underwater diving – as a human activity, is the practice of descending below the water's surface to interact with the environment.

What type of thing is underwater diving? 

Underwater diving can be described as all of the following:
A human activity – intentional, purposive, conscious and subjectively meaningful sequence of actions. Underwater diving is practiced as part of an occupation, or for recreation, where the practitioner submerges below the surface of the water or other liquid for a period which may range between seconds to the order of a day at a time, either exposed to the ambient pressure or isolated by a pressure resistant suit, to interact with the underwater environment for pleasure, competitive sport, or as a means to reach a work site for profit or in the pursuit of knowledge, and may use no equipment at all, or a wide range of equipment which may include breathing apparatus, environmental protective clothing, aids to vision, communication, propulsion, maneuverability, buoyancy and safety equipment, and tools for the task at hand.

Diving activity, by type

Modes of underwater diving 

There are several modes of diving distinguished by the equipment and procedures used:
 Freediving – Underwater diving without breathing apparatus
 Scuba diving – Swimming underwater breathing gas carried by the diver
 Surface-supplied diving – Underwater diving breathing gas supplied from the surface
 Saturation diving – Diving for periods long enough to bring all tissues into equilibrium with the partial pressures of the inert components of the breathing gas
 Atmospheric pressure diving – Diving where the diver is isolated from the ambient pressure by an articulated pressure resistant diving suit
 Unmanned diving – Diving by mechanisms under the direct or indirect control of remote human operators for observation, data collection or manipulation of the environment using on-board actuator devices

Diving skills and procedures 

Diving procedures – Standardised methods of doing things that are known to work effectively and acceptably safely 
 Ascending and descending (diving) – Procedures for safe ascent and descent in underwater diving 
 Ear clearing – An ascent to the surface by a diver in an emergency 
 Emergency ascent – An ascent to the surface by a diver in an emergency
 Controlled emergency swimming ascent – A technique used by scuba divers to return to the surface in an out-of-gas emergency in shallow water
 Controlled buoyant lift – A technique used by scuba divers to raise an incapacitated diver to the surface
 Boat diving – Procedures specific to diving from boats 
 Canoe and kayak diving – Recreational diving from a canoe or kayak
 Decompression (diving) – The reduction of ambient pressure on underwater divers after hyperbaric exposure and the elimination of dissolved gases from the diver's tissues 
 Decompression practice – Techniques and procedures for safe decompression of divers
 Pyle stop – Type of short deep decompression stops in addition to the standard profile
 Ratio decompression – Rule of thumb for estimating a decompression schedule for a given set of breathing gases
 Dive log – Record of diving history of an underwater diver
 Dive planning – The process of planning an underwater diving operation
 Diver communications – Methods used by underwater divers to communicate
 Diver navigation – Underwater navigation by scuba divers
 Diver rescue – Rescue of a distressed or incapacitated diver
 Diver trim – Balance and orientation skills of an underwater diver
 Drift diving – Scuba diving where the diver is intentionally transported by the water flow
 Finning techniques – Techniques used by divers and surface swimmers using swimfins
 
 Combat sidestroke – Variation of side-stroke swimming used by United States Navy SEALs
 
 
 
 
 
 Scuba skills – The skills required to dive safely using a self-contained underwater breathing apparatus
 Buddy breathing – Technique for sharing breathing gas from a single mouthpiece
 Buddy diving – Practice of mutual monitoring and assistance between two divers
 Buddy check – Pre-dive safety checks carried out by two-diver dive teams
 Low impact diving – Scuba diving that has minimal environmental effect
 Penetration diving – Diving under a physical barrier to a direct vertical ascent to the surface
 Rebreather diving – Underwater diving using self contained breathing gas recycling apparatus
 Scuba gas management – Logistical aspects of scuba breathing gas.
 Gas blending for scuba diving – Mixing and filling cylinders with breathing gases for use when scuba diving
 Rule of thirds (diving) – Rule of thumb for scuba gas management
 Scuba gas planning – Estimation of breathing gas mixtures and quantities required for a planned dive profile 
 Sidemount diving – Diving using an equipment configuration where the scuba sets are clipped to the sides of the harness
 Solo diving – Recreational diving without a dive buddy
 Surface-supplied diving skills – Skills and procedures required for the safe operation and use of surface-supplied diving equipment
 Underwater searches – Techniques for finding underwater targets

Underwater diving, by environment 

Underwater diving environment – The underwater environment to which a diver may be exposed
 List of diving environments by type – The variety of environments that people may dive in 
 Open-water diving – Diving in unrestricted water when the diver has unrestricted vertical access to the surface
 Altitude diving – Underwater diving at altitudes above 300 m
 Cave diving – Underwater diving in water-filled caves
 Deep diving – Underwater diving to a depth beyond the norm accepted by the associated community
 Ice diving – Underwater diving under ice
 Muck diving – Recreational diving on a loose sedimentary bottom
 Night diving – Underwater diving during the hours of darkness
 Recreational dive sites – Specific places that recreational divers go to enjoy the underwater environment or are used for training purposes
 Underwater environment – The aquatic or submarine environment 
 Wreck diving – Recreational diving on wrecks

Occupational diving 

Professional diving, also known as Occupational diving – Underwater diving where divers are paid for their work, or dive as part of their occupation
 Ama – Japanese pearl divers
 Aquarium diving – Occupational diving in large aquariums
 Commercial diving – Professional diving on industrial projects
 Commercial offshore diving – Professional diving in support of the oil and gas industry
 Hyperbaric welding – Welding metal at elevated pressure
 Nondestructive testing – Evaluating the properties of a material, component, or system without causing damage
  
 Diver training – Processes by which people develop the skills and knowledge to dive safely underwater
 Diving instructor – Person who trains and assesses underwater divers
 Diving school – Establishment for training and assessing underwater divers – A venue for training underwater divers
 Occupational diver training – Processes by which people develop the skills and knowledge to dive safely for diving at work
 Commercial diver training – Processes by which people develop the skills and knowledge to dive safely for industrial applications
 Military diver training – Training of underwater divers for service in the armed forces – Processes by which people develop the skills and knowledge to dive effectively for military applications
 Public safety diver training – Training divers for public safety services – Processes by which people develop the skills and knowledge to dive safely for public safety purposes
 Scientific diver training – Training divers who will be doing scientific work underwater – Processes by which people develop the skills and knowledge to dive safely for scientific projects
 Recreational diver training – Processes by which people develop the skills and knowledge to dive safely for recreational purposes
 Technical diver training – Processes by which people develop the skills and knowledge to dive safely for recreational technical diving
 Diver certification – Certification as competent to dive to a specified standard
 List of diver certification organizations – Agencies which issue certification for competence in diving skills
 Diamond Reef System – System for training divers in buoyancy, trim and maneuvering skills
 Divemaster, also known as Dive guide – Recreational dive leader certification and role 
 Diving contractor – The legal persona responsible for professional diving operations for a client – A legal entity responsible for professional diving work
 Haenyeo – Female occupational divers in the Korean province of Jeju
 Hazmat diving – Underwater diving in a known hazardous materials environment
 Media diving – Underwater diving in support of the media industries
 Military diving – Underwater diving in a military context by members of an armed force
 Defense against swimmer incursions – Methods of protection against incursions by underwater divers and swimmers
 Army engineer diver – Members of national armies who are trained to undertake reconnaissance, demolition, and salvage tasks underwater
 Clearance diver – Navy diver specialist with explosives
 List of military diving units – List of links to articles on notable military diving units
 Army Ranger Wing – Special operations force of the Irish Defence Forces
 British commando frogmen – Special Boat Service, whose members are drawn largely from the Royal Marines
 Canadian Armed Forces Divers – Underwater divers employed by any of the Canadian armed forces
 Clearance Diving Branch (RAN) – Diving unit of the Royal Australian Navy
 Comando Raggruppamento Subacquei e Incursori Teseo Tesei – Italian special forces diving unit
 Commandos Marine – Special operations forces of the French Navy
  – Special operations forces of the French Navy – Unit with combat swimmers. 
 Decima Flottiglia MAS – Italian naval commando frogman unit of the Fascist era
 Frogman – Tactical scuba diver
 GRUMEC, also known as Brazilian commando frogmen – Brazilian Navy special forces diving unit
 INSFOC – Indonesian Navy Special Force and Operations Command
 Kommando Spezialkräfte Marine – German postwar commando amphibious warfare force
 KOPASKA – Indonesian Navy special operations and demolition unit
 Marine Commandos – Special operations group of the Lebanese Navy
 Minedykkerkommandoen – Norwegian Navy clearance diver unit
 Minentaucher – Mine clearance divers of the German Navy
 PASKAL – Special operations force of the Royal Malaysian Navy
 Naval Service Diving Section – Diving unit of the Irish Naval Service
 Naval Special Warfare Command – Special operations force within the Military of Thailand
 Röjdykare – Clearance divers of the Swedish Navy
 Russian commando frogmen – Tactical scuba diving unit
 Shayetet 13 – Special operations unit of the Israeli Navy
 Special Boat Service – British special forces unit of the Royal Navy
 Special Service Group – Pakistan Navy special operations force
 Taifib – Indonesian amphibious reconnaissance unit
 Underwater Defence – Special operations unit of the Turkish Navy
 Underwater Demolition Command – Special warfare unit of the Greek Navy
 Underwater Offence – Special operations Forces of the Turkish Navy
 United States military divers – Underwater divers employed by the US armed forces, including navy, army, marine corps, air force and coast guard
 Master diver – Senior diver rating in US Navy
 Navy diver – US Navy personnel qualified in underwater diving and salvage
 Explosive ordnance disposal – US Navy personnel who render safe or detonate unexploded ordnance
 Underwater Demolition Team – US Navy special operations group
 United States Marine Corps Combatant Diver Course – Military diver training  for the US Marines
 United States Navy SEALs – US Navy special operations force
 List of United States Navy SEALs – Notable current and former members of the United States Navy SEALs and Underwater Demolition Teams
 United States Navy SEAL selection and training – Selection and training procedures and criteria
 National Navy UDT-SEAL Museum – Museum recording the history of US Navy UDT and SEAL teams and their members
 Underwater warfare – One of the three operational areas of naval warfare
 Nuclear diving – Diving in an environment where there is a risk of exposure to radioactive materials
 Pearl hunting – Collecting pearls from wild molluscs
 Public safety diving – Underwater work done by law enforcement, rescue and search and recovery teams
 Police diving – A branch of professional diving carried out by police services
 Special Duties Unit – Hong Kong Police tactical unit
 Salvage diving – Diving work associated with the recovery of vehicles, cargo and structures
 Scientific diving – Use of diving techniques in the pursuit of scientific knowledge
 Ships husbandry diving – Diving related to the maintenance and upkeep of ships
 Sponge diving – Diving to gather natural sponges
 Underwater archaeology – Archaeological techniques practiced at underwater sites
 Underwater demolition – The deliberate destruction or neutralization of man-made or natural underwater obstacles
 Underwater photography – Genre of photography
 Underwater search and recovery – Locating and recovering underwater objects
 Underwater videography – Branch of electronic underwater photography concerned with capturing moving images

Recreational diving 

Recreational diving – Diving for the purpose of leisure and enjoyment, usually when using scuba equipment
 Technical diving – Extended scope recreational diving
 Cave diving – Underwater diving in water-filled caves
 Doing It Right – Technical diving safety philosophy
 Shark tourism – Tourism industry based on viewing sharks in their natural habitat
 Shark cage diving – Diving inside a protective cage to observe sharks in the wild
 Shark-proof cage – A metal structure to protect divers and snorkellers from potentially dangerous sharks
 Shark baiting – Attracting sharks by chumming the water
 Underwater photography – Genre of photography
 Underwater sports – Competitive underwater recreational activities
 Aquathlon – Competitive underwater wrestling
 Competitive apnea – Competitive breathhold diving 
 Constant weight apnea – Freediving discipline in which the diver descends and ascends only by swimming with the use of fins
 Constant weight without fins – Freediving discipline
 Dynamic apnea – Freediving disciplines where the breath-hold diver swims horizontally under water with or without fins
 Free immersion apnea – Freediving discipline in which no propulsion equipment is used, but pulling on the rope during descent and ascent is permitted
 No-limits apnea – Freediving discipline in which the diver descends and ascends using their method of choice
 Variable weight apnea – Deep freediving using a weighted sled for descent, pulling along the depth rope for ascent
 Static apnea – Discipline in which the diver holds their breath underwater for as long as possible, and does not need to swim any distance
 Skandalopetra diving – Freediving using a stone weight at the end of a rope to the surface
 Finswimming – Competitive watersport using swimfins for propulsion
 2016 Finswimming World Championships – International competition in Volos, Greece
 2018 Finswimming World Championships – International competition in Belgrade, Serbia
 Apnea finswimming – Underwater swimming in a swimming pool using mask, monofin and holding one's breath.
 Finswimming at the 2009 Asian Indoor Games – Competition  held in Mỹ Đình National Aquatics Sports Complex, Hanoi, Vietnam
 Immersion finswimming – Underwater swimming using mask, monofin and underwater breathing apparatus in a swimming pool
 Spearfishing – Hunting for fish using a spear
 Sport diving – Underwater sport using recreational open circuit scuba equipment in a swimming pool
 Underwater football – Underwater team sport using snorkeling equipment and an American football
 Underwater hockey – Underwater sport of pushing a puck into the opposing goal
 Underwater ice hockey – Variant of ice hockey played upside-down underneath frozen pools or ponds on breath-hold
 Underwater orienteering – Underwater compass navigation and speed competition on scuba.
 Underwater photography – Competitive underwater digital photography on scuba
 Underwater rugby – Game where two teams try to score a negatively buoyant ball into the opponents’ goal at the bottom of a swimming pool on breath-hold
 Underwater target shooting – Breathhold underwater sport of target shooting with a speargun in a swimming pool.
 Wreck diving – Recreational diving on wrecks

Diving and support equipment, tools and weapons

Diving equipment

Autonomous underwater vehicles

Breathing gas

Decompression equipment

Diver propulsion vehicles

Diving safety equipment

Historical diving equipment

Rebreathers 

 
 
 
 
 
 
 
 
 
 
 
 
 
 
 
 
 LAR-5, LAR-6, and LAR-V represented by

Remotely operated underwater vehicles

Underwater breathing apparatus 

 
 
 
 
 
 
 
 
 Cylinder valve alias Pillar valve represented by Diving cylinder#The cylinder valve – A valve to control gas flow to and from a cylinder and to connect with the regulator or filling hose

Diving support equipment

Underwater work tools and equipment 

Underwater work tools and equipment – Tools and equipment used for underwater work

Underwater weapons 
Underwater weapons – Weapons that are intended for use underwater
 
 
 
 
 
 
 
 
 Underwater pistols 
 
 
 Underwater revolvers 
  
 Underwater rifles

Science of underwater diving

Physics of underwater diving

The diving environment

 
 
 
 
 
 
 
 
 
 
 
 Physical and biological aspects of the diving environment
  
 
 
 
 
 
 Hazards of the aquatic environment represented by List of diving hazards and precautions#The aquatic environment – 
 Hazards of the specific diving environment represented by List of diving hazards and precautions#The specific diving environment – 
 
 
  – A turbulent area of water caused by a strong current over an underwater ridge, or by currents meeting.
 
 
 Surge (wave action) currently represented by Waves and shallow water – the component of wave motion close to and parallel with the bottom

Physiology of underwater diving

Diving medicine, disorders and treatment

Diving medicine

Diving disorders and treatment

Diving safety related articles

Diving safety

Notable diving incidents rescues and fatalities 

 Early diving incidents
 
 
 Ebenezer Watson – nephew of Charles Spalding and died in the same accident
 Freediving incidents 
 
 
 
 
 Professional diving incidents
 
 Offshore diving incidents
 
 
 
 
 
 
 Rescues involving diving
 
 
 Professional diving fatalities
 Roger Baldwin (diver) represented by 
 
 Victor F. Guiel Jr. represented by 
 Craig M. Hoffman represented by 
 Peter Henry Michael Holmes represented by 
 Edwin Clayton Link represented by 
 Gerard Anthony Prangley represented by 
 Pier Skipness represented by 
 Robert John Smyth represented by 
 Albert D. Stover represented by  
 Richard A. Walker represented by 
 Lothar Michael Ward represented by 
 
 
 
 
 
 
 
 
 
 
 
 
 
 
 
 
 
 
 
 
 Chris and Chrissy Rouse, represented by

Legal aspects of diving 
 – how underwater diving and divers are affected by law
 
  – Legislation regulating diving activity, usually a branch of occupational health and safety.

Geography of diving

History of underwater diving

Frogman operations

Notable underwater salvage operations 

 HMS Royal George (1756)#Salvage attempts – Early salvage operation using bells and surface supplied divers
 SS Egypt#Salvage – Salvage of gold bullion from wreck using an armoured observation bell
 Kursk submarine disaster#Salvage operation – Raising the wreck of a Russian nuclear submarine
  represented by USS Sailfish (SS-192)#Sinking of Squalus and recommissioning – The successful rescue of the crew and later raising of the sunken vessel.

Diver training, certification, registration and standards

Diver training 
 
 Recreational diver certification represented by

Diver certification organisations 
 
 Occupational diver certification authorities 
 
 
 

 
 

 Recreational diver certification agencies 
 Freediver certification agencies 
 
 
 
 
 Recreational scuba certification agencies
 
 CEDIP members
 
 
 
 
  – the branch of the world underwater federation representing European affiliates

 
 
 
 
 
 
 
 
 
 European Underwater Federation certification
 
 
 
 
 
 
 
 
 
  – a recreational diver training and certification agency
 WRSTC and RSTC members
 
 
 
 
 
 
 
 
 
 Technical diver certification agencies
 Cave diving certification agencies
 
 
 
 
 
 
 
 
 
 
 
 
 
 
 
 
  – A recreational and technical diver training and certification agency

 Scientific diver certification authorities

Organisations setting international standards and codes of practice for diving and diver training 
 
 
 
 
 
 
 
 
 Scientific diving standards organizations

Commercial diving schools

Underwater diving organisations

Diver membership organisations 
Diver membership organisations 
 Freediver federations 
 
 
 
 

 Recreational and technical scuba clubs and associations 
 
 
 
 
 
 
 Military services recreational diving organisations
 

 Scientific, archaeological and historical diving organisations 
 
 
 
 

 National underwater-sports federations 
 
 
 
 
 
 
 
 
 

 International underwater-sports federations

Diver nature conservation organisations

Diving industry trade associations

Underwater environmental research organisations

Diving medical research organisations

Underwater diving publications

Books and manuals 

 
 
 
 
 
  
 
 
  A document providing extensive general information on the equipment, procedures and theoretical basis of underwater diving.
  Scientific diving manual published by the National Oceanographic and Atmospheric Administration
  John Bevan Ed. A manual of offshore diving

Legislation

Codes of practice
(National or international codes of practice for diving)
  
  A voluntary code of industry best practice followed by members of the International Marine Contractors Association.

Standards 
(National or international standards relating to diving equipment or practices)

Breathing apparatus
  Respiratory equipment - Self-contained re-breathing diving apparatus
  Transportable gas cylinders. Periodic inspection and testing of seamless aluminium alloy gas cylinders
  Transportable gas cylinders. Periodic inspection and testing of seamless steel gas cylinders
Swim fins

  Military specification. Swim fins, rubber.
  Ласты резиновые для плавания. Общие технические условия. Swimming rubber flippers. General specifications.
 DIN 7876:1980 Tauchzubehör. Schwimmflossen. Maße, Anforderungen und Prüfung. Diving accessories for skin divers. Flippers. Dimensions, requirements and testing.
 BN-82/8444-17.02 Gumowy sprzęt pływacki - Płetwy pływackie (Rubber swimming equipment - Swimming fins).
  Specification for rubber swimming fins. 
  Tauch-Zubehör; Schwimmflossen; Abmessungen, sicherheitstechnische Anforderungen, Prüfung, Normkennzeichnung. Diving accessories; fins; dimensions, safety requirements, testing, marking of conformity.
  Specification for rubber swimming fins. First revision.
  Diving equipment. Diving open heel fins. Requirements and test methods.

Diving masks

  Specification for snorkels and face masks. Amended 1977.
  Маски резиновые для плавания под водой. Общие технические условие. Rubber masks for submarine swimming. General specifications.
  Tauch-Zubehör. Tauchbrillen. Sicherheitstechnische Anforderungen und Prüfung. Diving accessories for skin divers. Diver's masks. Requirements and testing.
  Gumowy sprzęt pływacki - Maski pływackie (Rubber swimming equipment - Swimming masks).
  Underwater Safety. Recreational Skin and Scuba Diving. Lenses for Masks.
  Tauch-Zubehör; Tauchmasken (Tauchbrillen); Sicherheitstechnische Anforderungen, Prüfung, Normkennzeichnung. Diving accessories; divers’ masks; safety requirements, testing, marking of conformity.
   潛水鏡. Diving mask.
   潛水鏡檢驗法. Method of test for diving mask.
  Diving equipment. Diving mask. Requirements and test methods.
Snorkels
  Specification for snorkels and face masks. Amended 1977.
  Tauch-Zubehör; Schnorchel; Maße, Anforderungen, Prüfung. Diving accessories for skin divers. Snorkel. Technical requirements of safety, testing. 
  Tauch-Zubehör; Schnorchel; Abmessungen, sicherheitstechnische Anforderungen, Prüfung, Normkennzeichnung. Diving accessories; snorkels; dimensions, safety requirements, testing, marking of conformity.
  Tauch-Zubehör; Schnorchel; Sicherheitstechnische Anforderungen und Prüfung. Diving accessories for skin divers. Snorkel. Safety requirements and testing.
  Diving accessories. Snorkels. Safety requirements. 
  Diving equipment. Snorkels. Requirements and test methods.
Buoyancy compensators
  Diving accessories. Buoyancy compensators. Functional and safety requirements, test methods. 
  Diving equipment. Buoyancy compensators. Functional and safety requirements, test methods.
Wet suits
  濕式潛水衣. Diving Wet Suit.
  Diving suits. Wet suits. Requirements and test methods. 
  Diving suits. Wet suits. Requirements and test methods.
Dry suits
  Diving suits. Dry suits. Requirements and test methods. 
  Diving suits. Dry suits. Requirements and test methods.
Depth gauges
  Diving accessories. Depth gauges and combined depth and time measuring devices. Functional and safety requirements, test methods.
Diver training
  Recreational diving services – Requirements for the training of recreational scuba divers
  Recreational diving services – Requirements for training on environmental awareness for recreational divers
Recreational diving practices
  Recreational diving services – Requirements and guidance on environmentally sustainable practices in recreational diving

Journals and magazines 
  Magazine on technical diving, founded and edited by Michael Menduno
  Quarterly magazine of DAN om diving safety and recreational diving matters

Repositories

Recreational dive site guides 
Notable dive site guides with Wikipedia article.

Authors of publications about diving 

Authors of general non-fiction works on diving topics who are the subjects of Wikipedia articles.

Documentaries
Documentary movies focused on underwater diving.

Underwater diving in popular culture
Movies, novels, TV series and shows, comics, graphic art, sculpture, games, myths, legends, and misconceptions. Fiction in general relating to all forms of diving, including hypothetical and imaginary methods, and other aspects of underwater diving which have become part of popular culture.

Researchers in diving medicine and physiology

Underwater divers 

 Outline of underwater divers – Hierarchical outline list of biographical articles about underwater divers
 Index of underwater divers – Alphabetical listing of articles about underwater divers

Pioneers of diving 

 James F. Cahill – American scuba diving pioneer
 Alphonse and Théodore Carmagnolle – French inventors of the first anthropomorphic armoured diving suit
 Charles Condert – Inventor of an unsuccessful early scuba system
 Jacques Cousteau – Inventor of scuba-diving apparatus and film-maker
 Charles Anthony Deane – Pioneering diving engineer and inventor of a surface supplied diving helmet
 
 
 Guglielmo de Lorena – Italian inventor of a diving bell used for archaeological work on the Roman ships of lake Nemi
 Auguste Denayrouze – French inventor of a demand air supply regulator for underwater diving
 Frédéric Dumas – French pioneer of scuba diving
 Ted Eldred – Australian inventor of the single hose diving regulator
 Maurice Fernez – French inventor and pioneer in underwater breathing apparatus
 Émile Gagnan – French engineer and co-inventor of the open circuit demand scuba regulator
 Bret Gilliam – Pioneering technical diver and author.
 Edmond Halley – English astronomer, geophysicist, mathematician, meteorologist, and physicist
 Hans Hass – Austrian biologist, film-maker, and underwater diving pioneer
 Stig Insulán – Inventor of an adjustable automatic exhaust valve for variable volume dry suits
 Jim Jarret – Diver who test dived the first successful atmospheric diving suits
 Yves Le Prieur – French naval officer and inventor of a free-flow scuba system
 John Lethbridge – English wool merchant who invented a diving machine in 1715
 William Hogarth Main – Cave diver and scuba configuration experimentalist
 Phil Nuytten – Canadian deep-ocean explorer, scientist, and inventor of the Newtsuit
 Joseph Salim Peress – pioneering British diving engineer
 Benoît Rouquayrol – French inventor of an early diving demand regulator
 Dick Rutkowski – American pioneer in hyperbaric and diving medicine and use of mixed breathing gases for diving
 Joe Savoie – Inventor of the neck dam for lightweight helmets
 Augustus Siebe – German-born British engineer mostly known for his contributions to diving equipment
 Charles Spalding – Scottish confectioner and amateur diving bell designer
 Robert Sténuit – Belgian journalist, writer, underwater archeologist and the first aquanaut.
 Arne Zetterström – Diver involved in experimental work with Hydrox breathing gas

Underwater art and artists 

 Jason deCaires Taylor – British sculptor and creator of the world's first underwater sculpture park
 Christ of the Abyss – Submerged statue of Jesus Christ

Miscellaneous

Awards and events

See also

References

External links 

Underwater diving
Underwater diving